Lutibacter flavus is a Gram-negative, obligately aerobic and non-motile bacterium from the genus of Lutibacter which has been isolated from tidal flat sediments from the Yellow Sea in Korea.

References

Flavobacteria
Bacteria described in 2013